The 1890 New Brunswick general election was held on 20 January 1890, to elect 41 members to the 27th New Brunswick Legislative Assembly, the governing house of the province of New Brunswick, Canada. The election was held before the adoption of party labels.

The government of Andrew George Blair was able to remain in power with the support of Independent MLAs. Of forty-one MLAs, twenty-six supported the government, and fifteen formed the opposition.

References 

1890 elections in Canada
Elections in New Brunswick
1890 in New Brunswick
January 1890 events